Village Detective   is a 1969 Soviet crime comedy film directed by Ivan Lukinsky and based on the novella of the same name by Vil Lipatov. Lyrical detective lives of rural local policeman Aniskin.

Later on the screens came two sequels: Aniskin and Fantomas (1973) and Aniskin Again (1978).

Plot 
An accordion is stolen from a village club. For the collective farm, where an accordion is worth more than a good cow, this is a "crime of the century". When Aniskin is assigned to solve the crime, his suspicion falls on a man in love with a local store saleswoman.

Cast
 Mikhail Zharov as Fyodor Ivanovich Aniskin, rural district and a police lieutenant
 Tatyana Pelttser as Glafira Aniskina, his wife
 Natalya Sayko as Zina Aniskina, their daughter
 Lidiya Smirnova as Yevdokia Mironovna Pronina, rural shop clerk
 Roman Tkachuk as Gennady Pozdnyakov, head of the club
 Nikolay Skorobogatov as Ivan Ivanovich, chairman of the kolkhoz
 Georgy Slabinyak as Vitaly Pankov
 Anatoly Kubatsky as Ivan, an old farmer
 Vladislav Balandin as    Rafail
 Yuri Chernov as balalaika player Stepan
 Irina Zarubina as milkmaid Praskovya Pankova
 Maria Vinogradova as  strict mother

Awards
The film won the award for Best Comedy at the All-Union Film Festival in Minsk.

References

External links
 
 ‘The Village Detective: A Song Cycle’ Review: Bill Morrison Finds Fresh Angles on a Half-Forgotten Mystery

1969 films
Gorky Film Studio films
1960s crime comedy films
Soviet crime comedy films
Russian crime comedy films
Russian detective films
Soviet detective films
Films about police officers
1960s police comedy films
1969 comedy films